Jonathan Alan Gould (born 18 July 1968) is a football coach and former professional player who is a goalkeeping coach for Stoke City.

As a player, he was a goalkeeper from 1989 until 2009 playing for numerous clubs, notably in the Premier League for Coventry City and in the Scottish Premier League for Celtic. He also played in the Football League for Halifax Town, West Bromwich Albion, Bradford City, Gillingham, Preston North End, Hereford United and Bristol City. Born in England, he was capped twice by Scotland and was part of their squad for the 1998 FIFA World Cup.

Upon retiring from playing he joined New Zealand side Hawke's Bay United as player/manager in 2006, before moving to Wellington Phoenix as player/assistant coach in 2009. He has also worked on the coaching staff at West Bromwich Albion, Middlesbrough and Preston North End.

Personal life
Gould was born in England and is the elder son of former Wales and Wimbledon manager Bobby Gould.

Club career
Gould had a spell in New Zealand in 1989 playing for Napier City Rovers, where he won the New Zealand National Soccer League. Of note, Gould could not get a game in goal for Napier City Rovers and instead played for them as a defender. He returned to Britain and played for Clevedon Town, Halifax Town and West Bromwich Albion before making his name at Coventry City for whom he played 27 games between 1992 and 1996; first under his father Bobby and later under Phil Neal. He was given a free transfer by the Sky Blues in 1996 and joined 2nd Division Bradford City on deadline day. In May 1996 he played in Bradford City's 2-0 play off final victory against Notts County at Wembley, earning the club promotion to Division One (now known as The Championship). The following season, he was replaced at Bradford by Mark Schwarzer.

Celtic plucked Gould from Bradford City's reserves in August 1997 and he made his debut on 9 August 1997 in a 7–0 away win over Berwick Rangers in the Scottish League Cup. He quickly became one of the mainstays of the great championship winning side that prevented Rangers completing 10 in a row. Gould kept 24 clean sheets in 48 appearances that season and his performance in a gruelling 1–0 win over Aberdeen at Pittodrie in March 1998 was particularly outstanding.  In addition to his league championship winner's medal, Gould also picked a Scottish League Cup winner's medal that season in Celtic's 3–0 win over Dundee United in November 1997.

He continued as the No 1 under the stewardship of Josef Venglos and John Barnes. During 1999–2000 Gould generally remained the first-choice goalkeeper at Parkhead despite the arrival of Dmitri Kharine, and picked up another Scottish League Cup winner's medal when Celtic defeated Aberdeen 2–0 in the final on 19 March 2000. Another highlight that season was saving a penalty from Ronen Harazi in a UEFA Cup tie against Hapoel Tel Aviv to help his side progress. However, despite opening the 2000-01 Treble winning season as first choice and playing in the opening 13 league fixtures, Martin O'Neill signed Rab Douglas as a replacement. Douglas soon became first choice at Celtic, although Gould completed his hat-trick of Scottish League Cup winner's medals that season with Celtic's 3–0 win over Kilmarnock in the final on 18 March 2001 (Douglas was cup-tied having played for Dundee in an earlier round of the tournament). He also collected his second league championship winner's medal courtesy of his appearances earlier that season.

Despite his lack of first-team football at Celtic thereafter, Gould remained at the club for a further 3 years having been offered an extended contract by the manager, before eventually joining Preston North End on a free transfer in January 2003.

It was during this time at Preston that Gould enjoyed a renaissance in his form which resulted in a call-up into the Scotland Squad for the European Championship play-off games against Holland.

At the start of the 2004–05 season Gould went on loan to Hereford United where he made 15 appearances. He then signed for Bristol City on a free transfer in 2005 but after three months was released and it was then that he decided to retire from European football.

After becoming a member of staff at Hawke's Bay United, Gould played occasionally for the team in the NZFC.

As recently as 30 August 2009, Gould donned the gloves again, this time for the Wellington Phoenix in their 2–0 loss away to Sydney FC. Gould was on the bench as the reserve keeper due to the club's number one, Mark Paston being unavailable due to the birth of his first child. Had he come on, he would have been the oldest player to make an A-League appearance.

International career
Gould qualified to play for Scotland on the basis that his grandparents came from Blantyre in Lanarkshire. After an outstanding season at Celtic, he was called up to the international side for the 1998 World Cup but was third choice behind Jim Leighton and Neil Sullivan. After the competition he remained in the squad deputising for Sullivan and won his first cap on 9 October 1999 in a 3–0 win over Lithuania at Hampden in a qualifier tie for Euro 2000. Gould won his second and last cap a year later on 15 November 2000 in a 0–2 defeat in a friendly at Hampden against Australia.

Upon losing his first team place at Celtic to Rab Douglas, Gould drifted out of the international scene. His form at Preston North End a couple of years later won him a recall to the squad in November 2003 for the two-legged Euro 2004 qualifier against the Netherlands, albeit he did not play in either game.

Coaching and managerial career
In 2006, he became manager of New Zealand club Hawke's Bay United, assisted by his father Bobby Gould. In 2009, he left this role to take up an assistant coaching position with Wellington Phoenix FC. After two seasons with the Phoenix both of which resulted in the club reaching the finals series, Gould left to join Perth Glory and work alongside his former Rangers adversary Ian Ferguson. It was announced on 26 April 2012 Gould was returning to New Zealand on a two-year deal to continue his previous role as goalkeeping coach with the Wellington Phoenix.

On 16 February 2015 Jonathan Gould joined West Bromwich Albion as their first-team goalkeeping coach, working for manager Tony Pulis. After Pulis moved to Middlesbrough, Gould was appointed to the goalkeeping coach position there in January 2018. Gould was released from his position at Middlesbrough in May 2019. He was named Preston North End goalkeeping coach as of 12 August 2019, but returned to Napier City Rovers as a Goalkeeping coach for the Rovers Talent Pathway Programme. In March 2022 Gould was appointed the goalkeeping coach for New Zealand.

Gould returned to England in December 2022 joining Stoke City.

Honours
 Bradford City
 1995–96 Football League Second Division promotion play-offs: 1996

 Celtic
 Scottish Premier League: 1997–98, 2000–01
 Scottish League Cup: 1998, 2000, 2001
 Scottish Cup: 2001

See also
 List of Scotland international footballers born outside Scotland

References

External links
 

1968 births
Living people
Footballers from Paddington
Scottish footballers
Scotland international footballers
Scotland B international footballers
Scottish football managers
English footballers
English football managers
English people of Scottish descent
Association football goalkeepers
1998 FIFA World Cup players
Bradford City A.F.C. players
Bristol City F.C. players
Celtic F.C. players
Clevedon Town F.C. players
Coventry City F.C. players
Gillingham F.C. players
Halifax Town A.F.C. players
Hereford United F.C. players
People educated at Bristol Grammar School
Premier League players
Preston North End F.C. players
Scottish Premier League players
English Football League players
West Bromwich Albion F.C. players
Hawke's Bay United FC players
Expatriate association footballers in New Zealand
Napier City Rovers FC players
Scottish Football League players
Wellington Phoenix FC players
West Bromwich Albion F.C. non-playing staff
Middlesbrough F.C. non-playing staff
Preston North End F.C. non-playing staff
Association football goalkeeping coaches
Stoke City F.C. non-playing staff